Steve Veriato (born May 6, 1946) is an American professional golfer. He played on the PGA Tour, Asia Golf Circuit, Canadian Tour, and Champions Tour where he won once.

Veriato was born in Hilo, Hawaii. He played college golf at Texas A&M University and turned professional in 1973.

Veriato played on the PGA Tour from 1976 to 1980. His best ever finish was a solo 2nd at the 1977 Atlanta Classic. He was then primarily a club pro in Texas for 14 years. Concurrent with his experience as a club pro, however, he also occasionally played on some minor international circuits. He played the Canadian Tour in 1988 and 1989 and the Asia Golf Circuit in 1975, 1988, 1989, and 1995. He joined the Senior PGA Tour after he turned 50. In 2001, he won the 2001 Novell Utah Showdown.

Professional wins (6)

Regular career wins (5)
1976 Hawaii State Open
1977 Hawaii State Open
1987 Southern Texas PGA Championship
1988 Southern Texas PGA Championship
1994 Southern Texas PGA Championship

Champions Tour wins (1)

U.S. national team appearances
PGA Cup: 1992 (winners)

See also 

 Fall 1975 PGA Tour Qualifying School graduates

External links

American male golfers
Texas A&M Aggies men's golfers
PGA Tour golfers
Asian Tour golfers
PGA Tour Champions golfers
Golfers from Hawaii
Golfers from Texas
People from Hilo, Hawaii
People from Buda, Texas
1946 births
Living people